The Bobbitt reaction is a name reaction in organic chemistry. It is named after the American chemist James M. Bobbitt. The reaction allows the synthesis of 1-, 4-, and N-substituted 1,2,3,4-tetrahydroisoquinolines and also 1-, and 4-substituted isoquinolines.

General Reaction Scheme 
The reaction scheme below shows the  synthesis of 1,2,3,4-tetrahydroisoquinoline from benzaldehyde and 2,2-diethylethylamine.

Reaction Mechanism 
A possible mechanism is depicted below:

First the benzaliminoacetal 3 is built by the condensation of benzaldehyde 1 and 2,2-diethylethylamine 2. After the condensation the C=N-double bond in 3 is hydrogenated to form 4. Subsequently, an ethanol is removed. Next, the compound 5 is built including the cyclization step. After that the C=C-double bond in 5 is hydrogenated . Thus, 1,2,3,4-tetrahydroisoquinoline 6 is formed.

Applications 
The Bobbitt reaction has found application in the preparation of some alkaloids such as carnegine, lophocerine, salsolidine, and salsoline.

See also
 Pomeranz–Fritsch reaction

References 

Nitrogen heterocycle forming reactions
Heterocycle forming reactions
Name reactions
Isoquinolines